This section of the Timeline of Quebec history concerns events through 1533.

Prehistory
 Paleo-Amerindians, whose presence in Quebec can be traced back 10,000 years, preceded the Algonquian and Iroquoian aboriginal peoples, with whom the Europeans first made contact in the 16th century.
 Some 8,500 years ago, the south of Quebec became habitable as it grew warmer. The first peoples began to immigrate on what is today the Province of Quebec. They were the ancestors of today's Algonquian and Iroquoian peoples.

15th century
1492 - For the Queen of Castile (later, Spain), Christopher Columbus crosses the Atlantic Ocean. 
1497 - John Cabot reaches the island of Newfoundland, which he claims for England. Jacques Cartier is born on Dec. 31st 1491.

16th century
1524 - Giovanni da Verrazzano, a Florentine in the service of the King Francis I of France explores the East coast of North America from Florida to Newfoundland.
1525 and after - Basque fishermen and whalers regularly sail in the St. Lawrence estuary and the Saguenay River.

References

See also

 1400
1400
Quebec 1400
Quebec 1400
Quebec 1500
Quebec 1400
Quebec 1500
.1400